Superkart is a form of motorsport road racing that uses karts on long circuits.

The most obvious difference between a superkart and most other forms of kart is that they have full aerodynamic bodykits as well as having a longer wheel base than sprint chassis and are generally raced on car circuits over 1,500 metres in length. The power unit, most often, but not exclusively two-stroke 250 cc engines, can be specially designed kart engines or production motorcycle engines with either five- or six-speed sequential manual gearboxes. Owing to their high top speed and superb cornering ability, a superkart's aerodynamic bodywork includes a front fairing, larger sidepods, and a rear wing. They use either  tires and wheels and most often race on full size auto-racing circuits.

The 250 cc superkarts can set faster lap times than much more expensive and technically advanced racing machines. Some British and Australian classes also include 125 cc gearbox karts.

Superkarts race on "long circuits" (e.g. Silverstone, Laguna Seca, Magny-Cours). In the UK they also race on "short circuits" (e.g. Kimbolton); "short circuits" are under 1,500 metres in length.

Superkarts are raced worldwide. There is a multi-event CIK-FIA European Superkart Championship (for 250 cc karts only), and there has in the past been a world championship, which was last run in 1995.

Performance
Powered by a two-stroke 250 cc engine producing  for an overall weight including the driver of 205 kilograms (452 lb), superkarts have a power/weight ratio (including the driver) of approximately 365 W/kg (490 hp/tonne)(0.22 hp/lb), or closer to 730 W/kg (980 hp/tonne)(0.44 hp/lb) without the driver, which is about the equivalent of a midget car, or an open-wheel A1 Grand Prix car. Their low weight and good downforce make for excellent cornering and braking abilities.

British superkart divisions :

Division 1 is open to 250 cc twin cylinder engines with five or six speed gearboxes. Typically the karts produce  and are capable of  - the fastest form of kart. This formula was previously known as Formula E, which was changed to avoid confusion with the Formula E series.
250 National is for single cylinder karts with five- and six-speed boxes. However, being lighter than the twin cylinder (Division 1) karts they can be as quick on twisty circuits. This formula was previously known as 250 International. 

Australian superkart divisions :

Superkart racing in Australia has, since 1989, referred to any form of racing kart to race on full-size motor racing circuits, usually as sanctioned by the Australian ASN, CAMS.
250 cc International - commonly referred to as twins or inters, these karts are powered by twin cylinder engines and usually have six-speed sequential gearboxes. Several European and North American chassis are popular in addition to locally developed designs.
250 cc National - single cylinder class, the 250 National class is powered by 250 cc motocross engines and also feature six-speed sequential gearboxes.
125 cc Gearbox - most often powered by 125 cc Honda and Yamaha Grand Prix motorcycle engines equipped with six-speed sequential gearboxes, this superkart class uses mostly the same chassis as the 250 classes. They run at lighter weights than the 250 classes, which makes for close racing with mid-field 250 Nationals at some circuits.
80 cc Gearbox - also dominated by Honda and Yamaha motor cycle engines, 80 cc Gearbox is no longer a sanctioned class in Australian racing. Some 80 cc karts were noticeably smaller than 125/250 cc gearbox karts, with "laydown"-style karts, where the driver lies flat in the kart rather than sitting upright, proliferating. Last contested at the national level in 2005. and state level in 2008, some 80 cc karts survive racing in the 125 cc division at state level, but are uncompetitive as they no longer run at lighter homologated weight levels.
125 cc Rotax Max - a cross-over class from Australian short-circuit non-gearbox sprint kart racing to allow easier and cheaper graduation from sprint kart racing to long circuit racing. Three national championships exist for two weight divisions, Heavy, Light, and also sometimes a Junior division for drivers under the age of sixteen which run a version of the Rotax Max engine without a power valve. Rotax Max karts frequently race amongst gearbox-equipped superkarts at the state championship level, while racing for their own titles at the national level.
100 cc -  another non-gearbox class, 100 cc also was split into Heavy, Light and Junior classes, was last contested in 2002 and has since been replaced completely by Rotax Max.

United States superkart classes:

250 cc Formula/E or F/E - Twin cylinder, six-speed, liquid cooled Grand Prix motorcycle engines such as the Honda RS250, Yamaha TZ250 or made for kart racing engines such as the BRC250.
250 cc Inter-Continental E or IC/E - Single cylinder, five- or six-speed, liquid cooled Grand Prix motorcycle engines.

Spectacle

Road & Track reports that superkarts cost between $15,000 to US$20,000  in 2005. Entries of 60 or more are common in Britain. Overtaking tends to be easy, as there is room to get past, so the races tend to be full of action. Race lengths tend to be around 20–25 miles (30–40 km), because the fuel tanks are quite small, so at most meetings that feature superkarts, the karts race is often a brief, spectacular highlight (U.S. superkart races are timed 30-minute races; pre-final on Saturday, final on Sunday).

A global category, superkarts are endorsed by the FIA, and were featured as a support category to the French Formula 1 Grand Prix at Magny-Cours in 2007 where they bettered Porsche Supercup lap times.

See also
 Kart circuits
 KF1, the top level of karting
 KF2, a KF1 feeder series
 KF3, a KF2 and KF1 feeder series
 KZ1, the fastest KZ karting racing category
 KZ2, the second fastest KZ karting racing category

References

External links
 

 
Kart racing series
Kart models
Formula racing
Motorsport categories in Australia